Elegy is a 2008 American romantic drama film directed by Isabel Coixet. Its screenplay is adapted by Nicholas Meyer from the 2001 novel The Dying Animal by Philip Roth. The film stars Penélope Cruz, Ben Kingsley, and Dennis Hopper, and features Patricia Clarkson and Peter Sarsgaard in supporting roles. The film was set in New York City but was shot in Vancouver.

Plot
David Kepesh is a cultural critic and professor, in a state of 'emancipated manhood': His relationships with women are usually casual, brief and sexual in nature. Previously married, he has a son who has never forgiven him for leaving his mother. His friend, Pulitzer Prize-winning poet George O'Hearn, suggests that he "bifurcate" his life: have conversations and enjoy art with a wife, and "keep the sex just for sex". David is also in a casual 20-year relationship with Caroline, another former student.

He encounters Consuela Castillo, a beautiful and confident student who attends one of his lectures. She captures his attention like no other woman, and they begin a serious relationship. George advises him to leave her before she leaves him, but David cannot bring himself to give her up. They are a couple for a year and a half, during which he continues to sleep with Caroline; neither woman knows of the other's existence.

Over dinner, Consuela invites David to her graduation party. After some hesitation, he agrees to attend. On the day of the event, David phones Consuela and claims he is stuck in traffic and will be unavoidably delayed. In reality, he is sitting in his car, anxious about meeting Consuela's family. Heartbroken, Consuela hangs up, and they end their relationship. Shortly afterward, George suffers a stroke during a poetry conference after David introduces him, and later dies. David realizes too late that he genuinely loved Consuela, and ends his relationship with Caroline. He somewhat mends his relationship with his son, Kenny, who reveals that he is having an affair and indirectly asks David for advice.

Two years pass before Consuela and David come into contact again. On New Year's Eve, David arrives home to find a message from Consuela. She mentions that she needs to tell him something before he finds out from someone else. At his apartment, Consuela announces that she has found a lump in her breast and will need surgery. Grief-stricken, David cries and asks her why she didn't tell him sooner. Consuela then asks David to take photos of her breasts, before the doctors "ruin" them. David agrees.

In the final scene, David visits Consuela at the hospital where she is recovering from a mastectomy. Consuela says, "I will miss you". David responds, "I am here" as he climbs into the hospital bed and gently kisses her face. In a fantasy scene, the film flashes back to David and Consuela on the beach where Consuela told David she loves him.

Cast
 Penélope Cruz as Consuela Castillo
 Ben Kingsley as David Kepesh
 Dennis Hopper as George O'Hearn
 Patricia Clarkson as Caroline
 Peter Sarsgaard as Kenneth Kepesh
 Deborah Harry as Amy O'Hearn
 Charlie Rose as himself
 Antonio Cupo as Younger Man
 Michelle Harrison as 2nd Student
 Sonja Bennett as Beth
 Chelah Horsdal as Susan Reese

Critical reception
Elegy received generally favorable reviews from the majority of critics. It currently holds a 75% "Fresh" rating on Rotten Tomatoes, based on 118 reviews, with an average rating of 6.7/10. The website's critical consensus states, "An intelligent, adult, and provocative Philip Roth adaptation that features classy performances, Elegy is never quite the sum of its parts."  The film also holds a rating of 66/100 based on thirty-two reviews on Metacritic, indicating "generally favorable" reviews.

Top ten lists
The film appeared on several critics' top ten lists of the best films of 2008.
 3rd – Kimberly Jones, The Austin Chronicle
 4th – Mike Russell, The Oregonian
 5th – Marjorie Baumgarten, The Austin Chronicle
 6th – Andrea Gronvall, Chicago Reader

References

External links
 
 
 
 
 

2008 films
2008 romantic drama films
Adultery in films
American romantic drama films
Films about scandalous teacher–student relationships
Films based on American novels
Films based on works by Philip Roth
Films directed by Isabel Coixet
Films produced by Gary Lucchesi
Films produced by Tom Rosenberg
Films set in New York City
Films shot in Vancouver
Lakeshore Entertainment films
Films with screenplays by Nicholas Meyer
2000s Spanish-language films
Films set in universities and colleges
2000s English-language films
2000s American films